Manaosella is a monotypic genus of flowering plants belonging to the family Bignoniaceae. The only species is Manaosella cordifolia.

Its native range is Venezuela to Brazil and Bolivia.

References

Bignoniaceae
Bignoniaceae genera
Monotypic Lamiales genera